Apfelbaum is a Jewish surname. It may refer to:

Apfelbaum
 Anna Apfelbaum (1897-1987), Polish fashion designer and co-founder of Maximilian Furs, New York
 Dawid Moryc Apfelbaum, nom de guerre of a fighter in the Warsaw Ghetto Uprising
 Jay Apfelbaum (born 1951), American bridge player
 Grigory Zinoviev (1883–1936), also known as Ovsei-Gershon Aronovich Randomsky, born Hirsch Apfelbaum, Soviet politician
 Maximilian Apfelbaum (d.1953) Polish furrier and co-founder of Maximilian Furs, New York
 Peter Apfelbaum (1960–), American jazz musician and composer
 Polly Apfelbaum (1955–), American visual artist
 Stacy Apfelbaum, American athlete

Appelbaum 
 Binyamin Appelbaum, American journalist
 Diana Muir Appelbaum, American author and historian
 Eileen Appelbaum (born 1940), American economist
 Ian Appelbaum, American physicist
 Jacob Appelbaum (1983–), American hacker, Core Tor member
 Jodi Appelbaum-Steinbauer (born 1956), American professional tennis player
 Joseph Appelbaum (1936–), Israeli engineer
 Josh Appelbaum, American screenwriter
 Judith Appelbaum (1939–2018), American editor and author
 LaDonna Appelbaum (1967–), American politician
 Paul S. Appelbaum, American psychiatrist
 Ralph Appelbaum, American museum designer and planner
 Richard A. Appelbaum, Rear Admiral in the United States Coast Guard.
 Robert Appelbaum (born 1952), American literary critic and academic
 Stephen A. Appelbaum (1926–2000) American psychologist
 Yoni Appelbaum, American editor

Apelbaum 
 Sam Apelbaum, Canadian politician

Epel'baum (Эпельбаум)
Mikhail Apelbaum (1894–1957), Soviet Jewish singer and actor
Naum Moiseevich Epelbaum (1927–2019), Soviet Moldavian sculptor
Brunhilda Petrovna Epelbaum-Marchenko (1927–1914), Soviet Moldavian sculptor and painter

See also 
 Applebaum

References 

Jewish surnames
German-language surnames
Germanic-language surnames
Yiddish-language surnames